Jang Dong-woo (Hangul: 장동우; hanja: 張東雨; born November 22, 1990), commonly known as Dongwoo, is a South Korean singer, rapper, dancer, and actor. He is the main rapper of South Korean boy band Infinite and its sub-unit Infinite H.

Biography
Jang Dong-woo was born in Guri, Gyeonggi-do, South Korea. He was trained under JYP Entertainment for years. He is a former schoolmate of Exo member Xiumin. Prior to their debut with Infinite, he and Hoya performed as a back-up dancer for various music promotion show Epik High’s Run.

On February 15, 2013 Dongwoo graduated from Daekyeung University's Practical Music program. He along with members Sunggyu, Hoya, Sungyeol and L, received the 'Proud Daekyung University Student award'.

On September 2, 2016, it was announced that Dongwoo's father had died from a chronic illness.

Career

2010: Debut with Infinite

Dongwoo debuted as a member of South Korean boy group Infinite in 2010. The group officially debuted on June 9, 2010.

2012–14: Solo activities and Infinite H

In September 2012, Dongwoo, along with Infinite member Hoya, formed a sub-unit called Infinite H, releasing their first extended play titled Fly High in early-2013. The sub-unit has a different musical direction and style concept from Infinite, placing their focus on each member's rap and performances ability.

In January 2012, he was featured in Baby Soul and Yoo Ji-a single, "She Is a Flirt". The same year he performed with Sunggyu and Baby Soul on Immortal Songs 2 for the song "Woman On the Beach".

In August 2013, he and Hoya starred in Tasty’s "Mamama" music video. The duo contributed to the lyrics of the song.

In November 2014, he featured on Nicole's extended play First Romance, track titled "7-2-Misunderstanding".

2015–present: Solo activities

Dongwoo made his debut as a musical actor, in the musical In The Heights. Dongwoo plays the role of main lead "Usnavi" along with Yang Dong-geun, Jung Won-young and Key. The musical was produced by SM C&C, a subsidiary of S.M. Entertainment, and ran from September 4 to November 22 at 'Blue Square'.
In 2015, he along with B1A4's Baro featured in Ami's track Sick to the Bone.

In October 2016, he released his first self-produced song with vocals featured by Yoon So-yoon, titled "Embedded in Mind". The song was for webtoon Lookism.

On April 15, 2019, Dongwoo enlisted for his mandatory military service, serving as an active duty soldier.

He completed his military service on November 15, 2020.

On March 31, 2021, Dongwoo departed from Woollim after his contract expired.

On October 1, 2021, Dongwoo signed an exclusive contract with Big Boss Entertainment.

Discography

Extended plays

Singles

Songwriting credits

Filmography

Television series

Musical

Notes

References

External links

 

South Korean male rappers
South Korean male singers
South Korean male idols
South Korean pop singers
1990 births
Living people
People from Guri
Infinite (group) members
South Korean hip hop dancers